Ben Moore (January 1, 1891 – September 25, 1958) was a United States district judge of the United States District Court for the Southern District of West Virginia.

Education and career

Born in Salyersville, Kentucky, Moore read law in 1915, and was in private practice in Charleston, West Virginia from 1915 to 1940. He was a Commissioner in Chancery for the Circuit Court of Kanawha County, West Virginia from 1918 to 1940, and a Judge of the Court of Common Pleas of Kanawha County in 1941.

Federal judicial service

Moore was nominated by President Franklin D. Roosevelt on March 1, 1941, to a seat on the United States District Court for the Southern District of West Virginia vacated by Judge George Warwick McClintic. He was confirmed by the United States Senate on March 20, 1941, and received his commission on March 27, 1941. He served as Chief Judge from 1948 to 1958. His service terminated on September 25, 1958, due to his death.

References

Sources
 

1891 births
1958 deaths
Judges of the United States District Court for the Southern District of West Virginia
Lawyers from Charleston, West Virginia
People from Magoffin County, Kentucky
United States district court judges appointed by Franklin D. Roosevelt
20th-century American judges
West Virginia circuit court judges
West Virginia lawyers
United States federal judges admitted to the practice of law by reading law
American lawyers admitted to the practice of law by reading law
20th-century American lawyers